Huty is an urban-type settlement in Bohodukhiv Raion of Kharkiv Oblast in Ukraine. It is located on the banks of the Merla, a tributary of the Vorskla in the drainage basin of the Dnieper. Huty belongs to Bohodukhiv urban hromada, one of the hromadas of Ukraine. Population:

Economy

Transportation
The closest passenger railway station is located in Bohodukhiv, on the railway connecting Kharkiv and Sumy.

The settlement has local access to Bohodukhiv, and from there to Kharkiv and Sumy.

References

Urban-type settlements in Bohodukhiv Raion